The German 28 cm C/28 was a 283 mm 52-caliber built-up gun designed in 1928 and used on the  cruisers.

History

Characteristics
Characteristics of SK C/28 and the later SK C/34 283 mm shells are in the table below:

Performance of the SK C/28 at different ranges, firing a 300 kg armour-piercing projectile :

See also
 List of naval guns
 28 cm SK C/34 naval gun

Footnotes
Notes

Citations

External links 

 

Naval guns of Germany
280 mm artillery
World War II naval weapons
Military equipment introduced in the 1930s